Vayalathala is a small village situated in the Pathanamthitta district of Kerala State in India.

Location
Vayalathala place is situated 8 km from Ranni, 8 km from Kozhencherry and 8 km from the Pathanamthitta District headquarters. This village is under governance of Cherukole Grama Panchayat. Chakkappalam @ puthamon are the gateways to Vayalathala Gramam (from Ranny-Kozhencherry main road), Kudilumukku, Parankimanthodom, Thottungal padi, Palliyathu Padi, post office Padi are the common junctions in this locality.

Geography
The terrain of  this locality is mostly hilly with some paddy fields. The Major population in this area constitute of Christians and Hindus. Aaduparakkaavu Mala Nada Devi temple is the ancient Hindu worship place there. The concept "Mala Nada" symbolizes the heritage of ancient Dravidian culture here. Three Orthodox churches, one Catholic church, one Marthoma Church, One C.S.I. church and a Pentecostal church situated in this village.

Schools
Three primary schools are functioning in this village and one government operated old age home at Puthmon Junction.

Landmarks
The village has a post office, playground for volley ball (panchayath stadium) Primary health centre, Ayurvedic hospital, nursery school, Arts and Sports Club. The relationship between the people are very healthy and majority of the people cultivate rubber.

Transport                                                                               
There are a few private buses and a KSRTC bus from Pathanamthitta Depot operating in this area.

References

Villages in Pathanamthitta district